Maurizio Colombo (born 16 July 1963) is an Italian former cyclist. He competed in the individual pursuit and team pursuit events at the 1984 Summer Olympics.

References

External links
 

1963 births
Living people
Italian male cyclists
Olympic cyclists of Italy
Cyclists at the 1984 Summer Olympics
Cyclists from the Metropolitan City of Milan
People from Cuggiono